The  is a main battle tank (MBT) of the Japan Ground Self-Defense Force (JGSDF). It was designed and built by Mitsubishi Heavy Industries as a replacement for the Type 61 and to supplement the then current fleet of Type 74 tanks, and entered service in 1990. It is to be succeeded by the Type 10 tank.

History

After the adoption of the Type 74, the Japanese High Command was already looking for a superior, completely indigenous tank design to defeat the Soviet T-72. As a result, development of a prototype, the TK-X MBT began between 1976 and 1977. Joint development was performed by Mitsubishi Heavy Industries and TRDI (Japan Defense Agency's Technology Research and Development Institute). Major subcontractors included Japan Steel Works, Daikin Industries, Mitsubishi Electric, Fujitsu and NEC.

A first series of two prototypes of the Type 90 were developed, both armed with a Japanese 120 mm smoothbore gun (produced by Japan Steel Works Limited) firing Japanese ammunition (produced by Daikin Industries Limited). The first prototype (TK-X-0001) was completed by 1982, and underwent testing shortly after. Following the first tank's completion, development began on the second prototype (TK-X-0002), until it was completed by June 1985, after experiencing delays. Testing and design modifications such as improvements to the turret and half modular type ceramic composite armour were conducted starting in October 1983, and continued until October 1986.

A second series of four prototypes was built between 1986 and 1988, incorporating changes resulting from trials with the first two prototypes. These were armed with the Rheinmetall 120 mm smoothbore gun also fitted to the German Leopard 2 and, in a modified version,  the US M1A1/M1A2 Abrams main battle tanks. These second prototypes were used for development and then user trials, all of which were completed by December 1989, before Japan formally introduced the Type 90 in August 1990. Mass production began in 1990, and 30 vehicles were produced by the end of the year.

With the exception of the 120 mm smoothbore gun, which is made under license from Rheinmetall of Germany, the Type 90 and its subsystems are all designed and built in Japan, leading to higher per unit costs than comparable models from NATO countries such as the M1 Abrams and the Challenger 2. Development of upgrades to the Type 90 suffered both as a result of limited budget, which caused procurement delays, and funding prioritization in favor of the Type 10 main battle tank. Due to a perception that Type 90s are unsuited to operations in the tight confines of Japan's urban areas, they are preferentially assigned to the JGSDF Fuji School Brigade and the 7th Armored Division based in Hokkaido, where there is sufficient room for maneuver. With the exception of training exercises such as the annual Combined Live Fire Exercise hosted by the United States Army at Yakima Training Center in Washington state, the Type 90 has never been deployed overseas, and has never been tested in combat.

Design

Armament
The Type 90 mounts a Rheinmetall L44 120 mm smoothbore cannon licensed produced by Japan Steel Works Limited. This is the same gun that is mounted on the German Leopard 2, the American Abrams, and the South Korean K1A1 tank. Before Rheinmetall's gun was selected, Japan had successfully produced a domestic version of the 120 mm smoothbore for testing, but the lower cost of the Rheinmetall gave it an advantage over the domestic version..

Since its introduction there have been several upgrades to the fire-control system, including the addition of a Yttrium-Aluminium-Garnet laser rangefinder with a range of 300 to 5,000 meters, a 32-bit ballistics analysis computer, improved thermal imaging and Automated-tracking systems, and improved gun stabilization. The FCS also has an automated tracking system, and is capable of engaging moving or stationary targets while moving in day or night. The automatic target tracking system uses a thermal image display which can be controlled by either the tank gunner or commander. It is capable of tracking soldiers, vehicles and helicopters. The targeting computer can also calculate lead on moving targets.

The commander's sight consists of a 3× / 10× (day-only sight). The sight can track vertically from −29 to +29 degrees, as well as track horizontally through 180 degrees. The gunners sight has a 10 x zoom.

The gun is armed and loaded by a mechanical bustle autoloader (conveyor-belt type) developed by Mitsubishi of Japan. As with autoloader-equipped Russian main battle tanks, the French Leclerc, and the Swedish Strv 103, the Type 90 achieves manpower savings by reducing the crew to three. Its ability to operate without a loader also allows the use of a smaller turret. The autoloader can reload in around two seconds, and the practical auto-loading and firing cycle for one target is around 4–6 seconds.

Mounted in front of the gunner's hatch on the turret is the ubiquitous Browning M2 machine gun, manufactured under license by Sumitomo Heavy Industries, part of the Sumitomo Group. In addition to the .50-caliber machine gun, a Japanese-built 7.62 mm machine gun is mounted coaxially to the left of the main gun.

Armor

The profile of the Type 90 is similar to the German Leopard 2A4 and it uses modular ceramic and steel composite armor, common in contemporary tank designs. The adoption of modular composite armor design facilitates the upgrading and exchange of the armor. 

It was designed with a distinctive low-slung turret with boxy, vertical sides and a long overhanging bustle.

Mobility
The powerpack of the Type 90 tank has the Mitsubishi 10ZG32WT 10-cylinder two-stroke cycle diesel engine providing 1500 hp, coupled with Mitsubishi MT1500 automatic transmission with four forward and two reverse gears, manufactured by Mitsubishi Heavy Industries (designated 10ZG32WT, MT1500). The development of the 10ZG32WT prototype was started in 1972 and was finished in 1982. It can attain a top output of 1,120 kW (1,500 horsepower @15min).

The hydropneumatic suspension units are mounted on the front and rear pair of road wheels, which can be adjusted on-the-fly to deal with uneven terrain, a requirement on Japan's rough, mountainous terrain.

According to the Japanese Ministry of Defense official data report, the acceleration of the type is 0–200 m in 20 seconds.

Manufacture
The Type 90 has an approximate unit cost of 790 million Japanese yen or approximately 7.4 million US dollars at 2008 exchange rates.

341 Type 90 tanks were produced between 1990 and 2009 with an average annual production number of 19 vehicles. The original procurement plan was established in the 1980s while Japan was experiencing asset price bubble. After the asset price bubble burst in 1991 and the collapse of Soviet Union in 1992, Japan started to cut its defense budget. In order to save budget for Kongo Class missile destroyers and other new weapons, Japan made a plan to reduce the size of its tank force. The production of Type 90 therefore slowed down and part of its budget was shifted to the research and development of the new Type 10 main battle tank.

Transportation
Being 12 tonnes heavier than its predecessor, the Type 74, the Type 90 was found to be more challenging to operate around Japan, with the exception of Hokkaido. Some politicians therefore criticized the effectiveness of Type 90 due to difficulty in transportation. In fact, more than 65% of major bridges in Japan were still considered passable for the Type 90, while overseas main battle tanks, such as Challenger 2 and Leopard 2, could only use 40% of bridges in Japan.

Operators
: 341 (2014)

Japan Ground Self-Defense Force
  Northern Army
  2nd Division
 2nd Tank Regiment
  7th Division
 71st Tank Regiment
 72nd Tank Regiment
 73rd Tank Regiment
 7th Reconnaissance Unit
  5th Brigade
 5th Tank Battalion
  11th Brigade
 11th Tank Unit
  JGSDF Fuji School
 Armor Department
 JGSDF Fuji School (Combined Training) Brigade 
 Armored Guidance Corps
 Training Evaluation Unit
  JGSDF Ordnance School (JGSDF Camp Tsuchiura)

See also
 Type 61
 Type 74
 Type 10

Tanks of comparable role, performance and era
 Arjun Mk 1: Indian main battle tank
 C1 Ariete: Italian main battle tank
 Karrar: Iranian main battle tank (equivalent to T-90M)
 M1 Abrams: US main battle tank
 T-90: Russian main battle tank
 Type 99: Chinese main battle tank
 Zulfiqar-3: Iranian main battle tank

References

 
 Christopher F. Foss (ed)., Jane's Armour and Artillery, Jane's Information Group, c1988

External links

 Type 90 tank at the Federation of American Scientists
 Type 90 Tank at Globalsecurity.org
 Main Battle Tank Type 90 at ArmsWorld
 Type 90 Main Battle Tank at Historyofwar
 Official unit cost data of Type 90 Main Battle Tank at Japan Ministry of Defense pdf file
 120 mm L44 Tank Gun at Rheinmetall AG
 Official Video -Type90 Tank- at Channel J (product cooperation:JGSDF)
 Official Video -Calflex 2006– at United States Central Command (U.S.CENTCOM)
 YouTube Video1 at YouTube
 YouTube Video2 at YouTube
 YouTube Video3 at YouTube
 YouTube Video4 at YouTube

Main battle tanks of the Cold War
Main battle tanks of Japan
Japan Ground Self-Defense Force
Tanks with autoloaders
Mitsubishi Heavy Industries armored vehicles
Military vehicles introduced in the 1990s